Hugo Lubliner (1846-1911) was a German dramatist, whose pseudonym was Hugo Bürger, born in Breslau. His plays include:
 Der Frauenadvokat (1873), his first great success
 Die modelle des Sheridan (1875)
 Auf der Brautfahrt (1880)
 Mitbürger (1884)
 Die armen Reichen (1886)
 Der riegnitzer Bote (1891)
 Das neue Stück (1894)
 Der schuldige Teil (1900)
 Die lieben Feinde (1901)
 Der blau Montag (1902)
 Ein kritischer Tag (1904)
 Frau Schubels Tochter (1905)

He also wrote novels which are considered of small literary value.

References

External links 
See also articles in the Jewish Encyclopedia under the names Lubliner and Burger.

 

1846 births
1911 deaths
19th-century German novelists
Writers from Wrocław
People from the Province of Silesia
German male novelists
German male dramatists and playwrights
19th-century German dramatists and playwrights
19th-century German male writers
19th-century German writers